Hemoglobin, beta pseudogene 1 is a human pseudogene with symbol HBBP1.

References

Further reading 

Genes on human chromosome 11
Pseudogenes